Eagle Hotel may refer to:

Eagle Hotel (Wilmington, Illinois)
Eagle Hotel (Concord, New Hampshire)
Eagle Hotel (Waterford, Pennsylvania)